Deltophora stictella is a moth of the family Gelechiidae. It is found in Spain, southern France and Italy.

The length of the forewings is 6-7.5 mm. The forewings are grey or grey-brown, but the apical portion beyond the end of the cell is sometimes darker than the basal two-thirds of the wing. Adults have been recorded on wing from the last third of June to mid-August, at altitudes between 700 and 2,000 meters. There seems to be one generation per year.

References

Moths described in 1927
Deltophora
Moths of Europe